The 11th National Basketball Association All-Star Game was played on January 17, 1961, in Syracuse, New York. The coaches were Red Auerbach for the East, and Paul Seymour for the West.

Eastern Conference

Western Conference

Score by Periods
 

Halftime— West, 84-62
Third Quarter— West, 115-97
Officials: Norm Drucker and Richie Powers
Attendance: 8,016.

References

National Basketball Association All-Star Game
All-Star
January 1961 sports events in the United States
1961 in sports in New York (state)
Basketball competitions in Syracuse, New York